Rudolph "Rudy" Hackett (born May 10, 1953) is a retired American professional basketball player. A  and  power forward, he played college basketball at Syracuse University.

College playing career
Hackett played college basketball at Syracuse University, with the Syracuse Orange, from 1972 to 1975.

Professional playing career
Hackett was selected with the 37th pick (3rd round) in the 1975 NBA draft by the New Orleans Jazz, and with the 25th pick (3rd round) by the Spirits of St. Louis in the 1975 ABA draft. He played for the Spirits, New York Nets, and Indiana Pacers over two seasons. Hackett also played professionally in Italy.

Post-playing career
Hackett is a strength and conditioning coach for the USC Trojans men's basketball team.

Personal life
Rudy Hackett married an italian woman, they have a son, Daniel Hackett, an Italian professional basketball player.

References

External links
 Rudy Hackett ABA/NBA stats @ basketballreference.com
 Rudy Hackett profile @ OrangeHoops

1953 births
Living people
All-American college men's basketball players
Basketball coaches from New York (state)
American expatriate basketball people in Italy
American men's basketball players
American strength and conditioning coaches
Basketball players from New York (state)
Indiana Pacers players
New Orleans Jazz draft picks
New York Nets players
Pallacanestro Reggiana players
Sportspeople from Mount Vernon, New York
Power forwards (basketball)
Small forwards
Spirits of St. Louis draft picks
Spirits of St. Louis players
Syracuse Orange men's basketball players
Mount Vernon High School (New York) alumni